Mararoa is a rural area and statistical area in New Zealand's Southland District. The area broadly corresponds to the course of the Mararoa River and the eastern part of Te Anau Basin, and includes the Mavora Lakes and the settlement of Manapouri. The Key is a locality which has the area's only primary school.

Demographics

Mararoa had a population of 774 at the 2018 New Zealand census, an increase of 60 people (8.4%) since the 2013 census, and a decrease of 15 people (−1.9%) since the 2006 census. There were 309 households. There were 402 males and 375 females, giving a sex ratio of 1.07 males per female. The median age was 44.2 years (compared with 37.4 years nationally), with 138 people (17.8%) aged under 15 years, 123 (15.9%) aged 15 to 29, 402 (51.9%) aged 30 to 64, and 108 (14.0%) aged 65 or older.

Ethnicities were 95.0% European/Pākehā, 9.3% Māori, 0.8% Asian, and 1.9% other ethnicities (totals add to more than 100% since people could identify with multiple ethnicities).

The proportion of people born overseas was 13.6%, compared with 27.1% nationally.

Although some people objected to giving their religion, 60.5% had no religion, 30.6% were Christian, 0.4% were Hindu, 0.4% were Buddhist and 1.9% had other religions.

Of those at least 15 years old, 105 (16.5%) people had a bachelor or higher degree, and 111 (17.5%) people had no formal qualifications. The median income was $37,800, compared with $31,800 nationally. 93 people (14.6%) earned over $70,000 compared to 17.2% nationally. The employment status of those at least 15 was that 405 (63.7%) people were employed full-time, 117 (18.4%) were part-time, and 3 (0.5%) were unemployed.

Education
Mararoa School is a full primary school serving years 1 to 8 with a roll of  students as of

References

Southland District
Populated places in Southland, New Zealand